Bob Vagg may refer to:
 Bob Vagg (footballer) (born 1942), former Australian rules footballer
 Bob Vagg (athlete) (born 1940), Australian former long-distance runner